Annette Jørgensen (born 25 April 1966) is a Danish swimmer. She competed in three events at the 1988 Summer Olympics.

References

External links
 

1966 births
Living people
Danish female swimmers
Olympic swimmers of Denmark
Swimmers at the 1988 Summer Olympics
People from Thisted
Sportspeople from the North Jutland Region